McCabe Creek may refer to:

McCabe Creek (Missouri)
McCabe Creek (Yukon)
McCabe Creek, Yukon, a locality in Yukon